Task Force 67 was created by William Halsey, Jr. during Guadalcanal Campaign of World War II and consisted of several destroyers and cruisers: 

 heavy cruiser 
 heavy cruiser

 heavy cruiser 

 light cruiser

 destroyer

Battles
Battle of Tassafaronga
Battle of Munda Point

Command
 RADM Carleton H. Wright upon creation
 RADM Walden L. Ainsworth after the Battle of Tassafaronga

References

United States Navy task forces